The by-election held in Mid Ulster on 11 August 1955 was called as a result of a vote in the British parliament on 18 July 1955 which voted 197 votes to 63 to nullify the result of the previous 1955 UK General Election in the constituency. At that election, Sinn Féin candidate Tom Mitchell took the seat.

In the by-election, Mitchell managed to retain the seat with an increase in the number of votes.

In the aftermath of the election, the defeated Unionist candidate successfully lodged a petition to have Mitchell, a convicted felon, removed as Member of Parliament (MP). The seat was subsequently given to Charles Beattie. However, as Beattie was at the time of his appointment a member of an appeals tribunal, considered "offices of profit under the Crown", the British House of Commons ruled that this disqualified him from the office of MP.

This led to the 1956 Mid Ulster by-election.

External links 
A Vision of Britain Through Time (Constituency elector numbers)

References 

1955 elections in the United Kingdom
20th century in County Londonderry
20th century in County Tyrone
August 1955 events in the United Kingdom
By-elections to the Parliament of the United Kingdom in County Londonderry constituencies
By-elections to the Parliament of the United Kingdom in County Tyrone constituencies
1955 elections in Northern Ireland